Parkers River is a river in Barnstable County, Massachusetts. It drains out of Long Pond in West Yarmouth, flows through  Seine Pond, and empties into the Nantucket Sound southeast of West Yarmouth. Named for Isaiah Parker who lived on the west bank of the river.

References

Rivers of Massachusetts
Rivers of Barnstable County, Massachusetts